Pulau Tikus is a state constituency in Penang, Malaysia, that has been represented in the Penang State Legislative Assembly since 2004. It covers two of George Town's affluent suburbs - Pulau Tikus and parts of Tanjung Tokong - as well as Gurney Drive.

The state constituency was first contested in 2004 and is mandated to return a single Assemblyman to the Penang State Legislative Assembly under the first-past-the-post voting system. , the State Assemblyman for Pulau Tikus is Chris Lee Chun Kit from the Democratic Action Party (DAP), which is part of the state's ruling coalition, Pakatan Harapan (PH).

Definition

Polling districts 
According to the federal gazette issued on 30 March 2018, the Pulau Tikus constituency is divided into 8 polling districts.

The constituency encompasses the Pulau Tikus suburb in its entirety and the southern part of Tanjung Tokong up to Fettes Road (Malay: Jalan Fettes). In addition, the whole stretch of Gurney Drive, the most famous seafront promenade in George Town, falls under this constituency. The constituency consist of a sizable  Peranakan and siamese electorate along kelawai and cantonment road.

Demographics

History

Election results 
The electoral results for the Pulau Tikus state constituency in 2008, 2013 and 2018 are as follows.

See also 
 Constituencies of Penang

References 
 

Penang state constituencies